Shamshad Begum (Hindi: शमशाद बेगम, IAST: Śamśād Bēgam; 14 April 1919 – 23 April 2013) was an Indian singer who was one of the first playback singers in the Hindi film industry. Notable for her distinctive voice and range, she sang over 6,000 songs in Hindustani, Bengali, Marathi, Gujarati, Tamil, and Punjabi languages, among which 1287 were Hindi film songs. She worked with renowned composers of the time, such as Naushad Ali and O. P. Nayyar, for whom she was one of their favorites. Her songs from the 1940s to the early 1970s remain popular and continue to be remixed.

Personal life
Shamshad Begum was born in Lahore, British India (present-day  Pakistan) on 14 April 1919 the day after the Jallianwala Bagh massacre took place in nearby Amritsar. She was one of eight children, five sons and three daughters, born to a conservative Punjabi Muslim family of limited means. Her father, Mian Hussain Baksh Maan, worked as a mechanic and her mother, Ghulam Fatima, was a pious lady of conservative disposition, a devoted wife and mother who raised her children with traditional family values.

In 1932, the teenage Shamshad came in contact with Ganpat Lal Batto, a Hindu law student who lived in the same neighbourhood and who was several years older than her. In those days, marriages were performed while the bride and groom were very young, and Shamshad's parents were already looking out for a suitable alliance for her. Their efforts were on the verge of bearing fruit in 1934 when Ganpat Lal Batto and Shamshad made the decision to marry each other. In 1934, despite strenuous opposition from both their families due to religious differences, 15-year-old Shamshad married Ganpat Lal Batto. The couple had but one child, a daughter named Usha, who in due course married a Hindu gentleman, Lieutenant Colonel Yogesh Ratra, an officer in the Indian Army.

In 1955, Ganpat Lal Batto died in a road accident. His death left Shamshad very distraught, because her husband had been the focus of her life and they had both been extremely devoted to each other. He had handled many aspects of her career and contracts and had been a major positive energy behind her career progression. After his death, Shamshad became listless and lost the fighting spirit to pursue her career, which registered a sharp decline thereafter. Indeed, while Shamshad Begum was both an outstanding singer and a successful famous one, she was at some deeper level always a wife and mother first, someone who instinctively prioritised her family over her career. By nature, she preferred to keep away from the public glare and from business dealings, taking the view that it was rather unseemly for a lady to be involved in such things. 

After her husband's death, Shamshad Begum began living with her daughter and son-in-law in Mumbai, first in south Mumbai and later at Hiranandani Gardens. She gradually became a recluse and devoted herself entirely to her grandchildren, to the point that the general public was unaware of whether she was alive or dead. In 2004, a controversy erupted in the media, when several publications wrongly reported that Shamshad Begum had died a few years previously. Shamshad's family clarified in a press release that this was not so. Her self-imposed seclusion is remarkable, because during all those decades away from the public eye, her old songs remained popular with the public and not a day passed without at least a couple of songs being played on Vividh Bharati and All India Radio.

Career

1924–40
Begum's talent was first spotted by her principal when she was in primary school in 1924. Impressed by the quality of her voice, she was made head singer of classroom prayer. At 10, she started singing folk-based songs at religious functions and family marriages. She received no formal musical training. Her singing ambitions, which she held from 1929, met with opposition from her family. In 1931, when she was twelve, her uncle, who enjoyed qawwalis and ghazals, secretly took her to Jenophone (or Xenophone) Music Company for an audition with Lahore-based musician and composer, Ghulam Haider. Begum said in an interview, "I sang Bahadur Shah Zafar's (the poet-ruler) ghazal Mera yaar mujhe mile agar." An impressed Haider gave her a contract for twelve songs, with the same facilities provided to top singers. It was Begum's paternal uncle Aamir Khan who convinced her father, Miya Hussain Baksh, to allow her to sing. When she won a contract with a recording company, her father agreed to let her sing on the condition that she would record in a burka and not allow herself to be photographed. She earned 15 rupees per song and was awarded 5,000 on the completion of the contract on Xenophone. Xenophone was a renowned music recording company, patronised by the rich, and her popularity grew in elite circles in the early 1930s.  Though she had won the Xenophone audition without having any formal music training, Hussain Bakshwale Sahab and later Ghulam Haider improved her singing skills between 1937 and 1939.

Her popular breakthrough came when she began singing on All India Radio (AIR) in Peshawar and Lahore from 1937. Producer Dilsukh Pancholi wanted her to act as well in a film he was producing. Begum readily agreed, gave a screen test and was selected. Her father became angry when he found out and warned her that she would not be allowed to sing if she continued to harbour a desire to act. Begum promised her father that she would never appear before the camera. She continued to sing songs on the radio. She never posed for photographs, and few people saw her picture between 1933 and the 1970s.

Begum sang for AIR through her musical group 'The Crown Imperial Theatrical Company of Performing Arts', set up in Delhi. The then AIR Lahore helped her to enter the world of movies as they frequently broadcast her songs, which induced music directors to use her voice for their films. Begum also recorded naats and other devotional music for a couple of gramophone recording companies. Her crystal-clear voice caught the attention of sarangi maestro Hussain Bakshwale Saheb, who took her as his disciple.

1941–45
Director Mehboob Khan brought Shamshad Begum to Mumbai after telling her husband 'I will take her to Mumbai and give her a flat, car, conveyance and even if four to six people accompany her, it's fine. Please let her come to Mumbai'. Her father was not convinced at first but later gave in as Shamshad wanted to come to Mumbai. Haider used her voice skilfully in some of his earlier films such as Khazanchi (1941) and Khandan (1942). By 1940, Begum was already well established on the radio. The songs "Cheechi Wich Pa ke Chhalla", "Mera Haal Vekh Ke" and "Kankaan Diyaan Faslaan" from Yamla Jatt of 1940 became a huge hit and popularised Pran, singer Begum and composer Haider. Haider continued to compose hit songs which Begum sang for films including Zamindar, Poonji and Shama.  Khan used Begum's voice in Taqdeer (1943), where he introduced Nargis as the heroine. Begum was soon singing for other composers including Rafiq Ghaznavi, Ameer Ali, Pt. Gobindram, Pt. Amarnath, Bulo C. Rani, Rashid Atre and M. A. Mukhtar, in the pre-independence era.

When Haider moved to Bombay in 1944, Begum went with him as a member of his team, leaving behind her family and staying with her Chacha (paternal uncle). After partition, Haider migrated to Pakistan but Begum remained in Mumbai. She had no known Pakistani connection post 1947. Begum became a national star between the early 1940s and the early 1960s, having a voice different from her peers such as Noorjehan (also discovered by Haider), Mubarrak Begum, Suraiya, Sudha Malhotra, Geeta Dutt and Amirbai Karnataki. Her peak period in the Hindi film industry was from 1940 to 1955 and again from 1957 to 1968.

1946–55
Begum sang extensively for composers including Naushad Ali, O. P. Nayyar, C. Ramchandra and S. D. Burman from 1946 to 1960. Naushad acknowledged in an interview that he was indebted to Begum in reaching the top, as she was famous before he became known in the late 1940s; after his tracks sung by her became highly popular, his talent was recognised.  It was Begum's solo and duet songs sung for Naushad in the late 1940s and early 1950s which made Naushad famous. After Naushad became successful he recorded songs with new singers as well in the early 1950s, but kept working with Shamshad in the late 1950s and early 1960s. Naushad chose his favourite singer Begum once again to sing four out of the twelve songs in Mother India.

Begum is credited with singing one of the first Westernised songs, "Meri jaan...Sunday ke Sunday" by Ramchandra. She kept getting more offers to sing songs and was the highest paid female singer from 1940 to 1955 and again post Mother India in 1957 to 1964. In 1949, music directors S. Rajeswara Rao, M. D. Parthasarathy and Balakrishna Kalla asked her to sing  "Jaiyo Jaiyo Shipayon Bazar" for P. Bhanumathi in the film Nishan, produced by Gemini Films of Madras, which became highly popular.

Although Burman started composing Bengali music in 1937, he achieved national fame with tracks sung by Begum in Hindi films. Burman was not well established as a music director in Hindi films until 1946; he then asked Begum to sing in his debut Hindi film as music director, Shikari (1946), with the song, "Kuch Rang Badal Rahi". In 1949, came Shabnam, in which Burman asked her to sing duets named "Pyar Main Tumne" and "Kismat Bhi Bhichadna" with Mukesh, which became popular. Shabnam was Burman's biggest hit to that date with Filmistan, and was especially noticeable for its multilingual song "Yeh Duniya Roop ki Chor", sung by Begum and acted by Kamini Kaushal, which became another hit. Burman subsequently asked her to sing tracks in Bazar, Mashaal, Bahar, Shahenshah, Miss India, and other films.  The song "Jaam Tham Le" from Shahenshah was a trendsetter for Burman compositions.

Begum had met Nayyar during her radio stint in Lahore, when he worked as an office boy delivering cakes for the lead singers. In 1954, when Nayyar got a break as a composer, he approached Begum to record songs for Mangu. Nayyar described her voice as resembling a "temple bell" for its clarity of tone. He worked with her until the late 1960s and gave her many hit songs, including "Ab To Jee Hone Laga" from Mr. & Mrs. '55, "Main Jaan Gayi Tujhe" from Howrah Bridge, "Zara Pyar Karle" from Mangu, "Saiyan Teri Ankhon Mein" from 12' O Clock, "Thodasa Dil Lagana" from Musafirkhana, and many others.

Several of her songs from this period remain extremely popular, including those acted by Nigar Sultana, such as "Teri Mehfil Mein" from Mughal E Azam and "Mere Piyan Gaye" from Patanga (1949), as well as "Saiyan Dil Mein Aana Re", acted by Vyjayanthimala, and "Boojh Mera Naam Hai", acted by Minoo Mumtaz. "Milte hi aankhen dil hua" from Babul (1950) had a romantic duet with Talat Mahmood, acted by Dilip Kumar and Munawar Sultana, which also became popular. Her duet with Rafi, "Chhala Deja Nishani" from Bazar became a mega-hit.

In the late 1940s, Kishore Kumar and Madan Mohan sang as chorus boys for her songs at the Filmistan Studio. Begum promised at this time that she would sing songs composed by Mohan once he started his career as a music director and would accept a lower fee. She also predicted that Kumar would become a great playback singer. She later recorded duets with Kumar, including "Gori ke Nainon Mein Nindiya Bhari" from Angarey and "Mere Neendon Me Tum" from Naya Andaz.

1955–76
Shamshad was at the peak of her career right from 1941 to 1955 and was the most in demand female singer and highest paid female playback singer from 1940 to 1955. She was the lead singer for many films like Taqdeer, Humayun, Shahjehan, Anokhi Ada, Aag, Mela, Patanga, Babul, Bahar, Jadoo, Aan and more. But after her husband's accidental death in 1955, Begum became a recluse and stopped accepting singing assignments, including recordings, for a year. Though she had stopped recording for her songs in the year 1955 after her husband's death, the songs released between 1955 and early 1957 including songs from films such as CID, Naya Andaz, Baradari, Mr. & Mrs. '55 and other hits continued to be popular . At this juncture Mehboob Khan approached her in 1957 and said he wanted a full-throated voice for Nargis in Mother India. The first song she sang after returning to her career was "Pee ke ghar aaj pyari dulhaniya chali" for Mother India. She made a successful comeback, and subsequently recorded many notable songs for films such as Howrah Bridge, Jaali Note, Love in Simla, Bewaqoof, Mughal-e-Azam, Bluff Master, Gharana and Rustom-E-Hind.

The well-known later playback singer, Lata Mangeshkar, started singing when Begum was at the peak of her career, with Begum's break after her husband's death boosting Mangeshkar's career and helping her get offers for high-quality songs. In the early careers of Mangeshkar, as well as her younger sister, Asha Bhosle, between 1944 and 1956, they had often been asked by producers and music directors to imitate Begum's style of singing, because producers could not afford Begum's fees. In their first song together, Mangeshkar was a part of the chorus while Begum was the main singer. Many of the songs sung by Lata like "Ayega Ayega" were sung in Shamshad Begum's style. Even Asha Bhosle's songs like her first duet with Kishore – "Aati Hai Yaad Humko" from the 1948 film Muqaddar bear direct resemblance to Shamshad Begum's style. From 1949 to 1960, beginning with the song "Dar Na Mohabbat Karle" from Andaz, Mangeshkar and Begum have sung many duets together, with the most famous being "Pyar Ke Jahan Ki" from the 1949 film Patanga, "Bachpan Ke Din" from 1951's Deedar; their last song together was Mughal-e-Azams song "Teri Mehfil Mein Qismat" in 1960. Begum sang songs together with Mangeshkar and Bhosle, including "Mubarak Ho Woh Dil Jisko" from Benazir . It was between 1958 and 1963 that the career of Lata got a major boost as music directors started gradually preferring her soft voice. Until then, Geeta Dutt and Begum were the most preferred singers, but Shamshad Begum continued to be at the top from 1940 until 1963.
From 1965, her songs started to be mimed by actresses other than the lead. Beginning in 1965, songs for her in films started getting reduced but the songs she sang instantly became hits through 1968. She then declared a self-imposed retirement in 1965. But she kept having certain composers asking her to sing songs in few films and among them her songs from films like in Daku Mangal Singh, Upkar, Kismat, Heer Ranjha, Johar Mehmood in Hong Kong, Teri Meri Ik Jindri and Main Papi Tum Bakhshanhaar. Her song "Kajra Mohabbat Wala" from the 1968 film Kismat and "Nathaniya Hale To Bada Maza" from the 1971 film Johar Mehmood in Hong Kong remains popular.

Retirement and death
From the late 1980s, Begum started giving occasional interviews. In one of her interviews with Filmfare magazine in 2012, Begum disclosed, "The more hits I gave, the less work I got. When I helped new composers I never told them to give me all their songs to sing. I believed only God could give, not them." Her final interview was in 2012. In 2009, she was conferred with the prestigious O. P. Nayyar Award for her contribution to Hindi film music. She was also conferred the Padma Bhushan in 2009. Later, her daughter Usha said in an interview, "Because of the politics in the industry, she didn't want to work any more. This is one of the reasons why she wouldn't let me be a singer. I told her, let me sing for my self-satisfaction, but she said if you learn to sing, you will directly enter the industry. So, she wouldn't let me do so."

Begum died at her Mumbai residence on the night of 23 April 2013 after a prolonged illness. She was 94. She was cremated in a small, dignified ceremony.

Information and Broadcasting minister, Manish Tewari said, "The film industry has lost one of its most versatile singers. Shamshadji's style of singing set new benchmarks. Her melodious voice with powerful lyrics gave us songs that have remained popular even today." Prime Minister Manmohan Singh said, "She was an artist of extraordinary talent and abilities, and the songs she has left behind in her long career, which she started with AIR in 1937, will continue to enthral music lovers." Her daughter Usha Ratra said, "She kept herself away from glamour of the industry despite being one of the top singers of her era as she did not like the limelight. My mother used to say that artistes never die. She wanted to be remembered for her songs."

Selected songs

 "Leke Pehla Pehla Pyar", "Kahin Pe Nigahen Kahin Pe Nishana",  "Boojh Mera Kya Naam Re"  – CID (1956); (Music: O.P. Nayyar)
"Savan Ke Nazare Hai" - Khazanchi (1941 film); (Music: Ghulam Haider) 
"Hum Dard Ka Afsana" - Dard (1947 film)
"Jab Usne Gesu Bikhraye" - Shahjehan (1946) (Music: Naushad)
"Main Bhawara Tu Hai Phool" (Duet with Mukesh) - Mela (1948 film); (Music: Naushad)
"Chandni Aayi Ban Ke Pyar" - Dulari (film) (1949) 
"Na Bol Pi Pi More Aangna" - Dulari (film) (1949) 
 "Milte Hi Aankhen Dil Hua", (Duet with Talat Mehmood) – Babul 1950; (Music: Naushad Ali)
 "Chali Chali Kaisi Yeh Hawa Yeh", (Duet with Usha Mangeshkar) –  Bluffmaster (1965); (music: Kalyanji Anandji)
 "Kabhi Aar Kabhi Paar Laga Teer-e-nazar", (Aar Paar 1954), (music: O.P. Nayyar)
 "O Gadiwale Dheere" – Mother India 1957; (Music: Naushad)
 "Ye duniya roop ki chor" – Shabnam 1949; (Music: S.D.Burman)
 "Mere Piya Gaye Rangoon" – Patanga 1949; (Music C.Ramchandra)
 "Ek Tera Sahara" – Shama 1946; (Music: Master Ghulam Haider)
 "Holi Aayee Re Kanhaai" – Mother India (1957); (Music: Naushad)
 "Haye ni mera baalam hai barha zalim" and "Teri kanak di rakhi"-Do Lachhian (1960) Punjabi Movie 
 "Naina Bhar Aye Neer" – Humayun (1945); (Music: Master Ghulam Haider)
 "Nazar Phero Na Humse" – (Duet with G M Durani) – Deedar (1951); (Music: Naushad)
 "Chod Babul Ka Ghar" – Babul 1950; (Music: Naushad)
 'Badi mushkil se dil ki beqarari ko qarar aaya' – Naghma 1953; (Music: Naushad) ; (Lyrics: Shoukat Dehlavi)
 "Kajra Mohabbatwala Ankhiyon mein Aisa dala" (Duet with Asha Bhosle) –  Kismat (1968); (Music: O.P. Nayyar)
 "Meri Neendon Main Tum" (Duet with Kishore Kumar) –  Naya Andaz 1956; (Music: O.P.Nayyar)
 "Teri Mehfil Mein Qismat" (Duet with Lata Mangeshkar) – Mughal-E-Azam 1960; (Music:Naushad)
"Pyar Ke Jahan Ki Nirali" (Duet with Lata Mangeshkar)  - Patanga (1949 film); (Music: C. Ramchandra)
 "Saiyan Dil Mein Aana Re" – Bahar 1951; (Music: S.D.Burman)
 "Reshmi Salwar Kurta Jaali Da" – Naya Daur 1957; (Music:  O.P.Nayyar)
 "Kisike Dil Mein Rehna Tha" – Babul 1950 – with Lata; (Music:Naushad)
 "Dharti Ko Aakash Pukare" – Mela 1948 – with Mukesh; (Music: Naushad)
 "Ek Do Teen Aaja Mausam Hai Rangeen" –  Awaara (1951); (Music: Shankar-Jaikishen)
 "Dil eechak beechak gurr" – "Bawre Nain" 1950 – (Music:Roshan)
 "Kahin pe nigahein" – "C.I.D." 1956 – (Music: O.P. Nayyar)
 "Door Koi Gaye" – "Baiju Bawra (1952)(Music: Naushad)
 "Chaman mein reheke veerana" – "Deedar" 1951 – (Music :Naushad)

References

External links

Legends – Shamshad Begum: Her profile, Interview, complete list of her songs and her work with Music Directors and Co-Singers

PLANET POWAI – Shamshad Begum

1919 births
2013 deaths
Indian women playback singers
Bollywood playback singers
People from Lahore
Assamese playback singers
Recipients of the Padma Bhushan in arts
Indian performers of Islamic music
20th-century Indian singers
Punjabi people
Punjabi-language singers
Urdu-language singers
Hindi-language singers
20th-century Indian women singers